Panmure is a former New Zealand parliamentary electorate in the southern suburbs of the city of Auckland, from 1984 to 1996. In the four parliamentary terms of its existence, it was first represented by Bob Tizard of the Labour Party, and then by his daughter Judith Tizard.

Population centres
The 1981 census had shown that the North Island had experienced further population growth, and three additional general seats were created through the 1983 electoral redistribution, bringing the total number of electorates to 95. The South Island had, for the first time, experienced a population loss, but its number of general electorates was fixed at 25 since the 1967 electoral redistribution. More of the South Island population was moving to Christchurch, and two electorates were abolished, while two electorates were recreated. In the North Island, six electorates were newly created (including Panmure), three electorates were recreated, and six electorates were abolished.

History
Panmure was a safe electorate for the Labour Party.

Members of Parliament
Key

Election results

1993 election

1990 election

1987 election

1984 election

Notes

References

Historical electorates of New Zealand
Politics of the Auckland Region
1984 establishments in New Zealand
1996 disestablishments in New Zealand